Awesome Tapes From Africa is a record label and website operated by Brian Shimkovitz, based in Los Angeles, California. The site was founded in 2006 in Brooklyn, New York.

History
The site was created as a way for Shimkovitz to share music he had come across while on a Fulbright scholarship in Ghana. He was interested in the variety of genres and artists he found, distributed largely on cassette tapes at markets, but that he had not come across outside West Africa. In 2011, Shimkovitz transitioned the site from just a blog with posted recordings of collected tapes posted without the artists' permission to a commercial record label. The goal of the company is to seed and expand an audience for the artists presented as well as provide opportunities to sell albums and tour. Artists are paid every six months and receive 50% of the profits from an album. Tapes presented on Awesome Tapes come from a variety of sources: gathered in Ghanaian street markets, purchased in stores in the US, or sent by others over the internet. In addition to the website, Shimkovitz DJ's concerts, clubs and at festivals as Awesome Tapes From Africa, as well as hosts a show on Dublab.

Most Awesome Tapes From Africa releases are official rereleases of out-of-print cassettes from African musicians and bands. SK Kakraba's Songs of Paapieye is the first album to consist of a new release. Although music is distributed in Africa via MP3 on mobile phones, Shimkovitz says the widest variety of music in West Africa is still available on cassette tape. In the journal Public Culture, Awesome Tapes From Africa, along with record labels Sublime Frequencies and Parallel World, is discussed as being emblematic of "World Music 2.0" for combining the "open source ethics of online networks with long-standing countercultural networks of circulation" within cassette culture and music distribution in developing nations.

Artists
Hailu Mergia
Walias Band
Dur-Dur Band
Bola
Penny Penny
Aby Ngana Diop
Ata Kak
SK Kakraba

Releases

ATFA001 - Nahawa Doumbia: La Grande Cantatrice Malienne, Vol. 3, 2011
ATFA002 - Bola: Volume 7, 2012	
ATFA003 - Bola: Remixes
ATFA004 - Dur-Dur Band: Volume 5, 2013
ATFA005 - Dur-Dur Band: Remixes, 2013
ATFA006 - Hailu Mergia: Hailu Mergia & His Classical Instrument: Shemonmuanaye, 2013	
ATFA007 - Hailu Mergia: Remixes, 2013
ATFA008 - Penny Penny: Shaka Bundu, 2013
ATFA009 - Penny Penny: Remixes, 2014
ATFA010 - Aby Ngana Diop: Liital, 2014
ATFA011 - Aby Ngana Diop: Remxes, 2014
ATFA012 - Hailu Mergia and the Walias: Tche Belew, 2014
ATFA013 - Hailu Mergia and the Walias: Musicawi Silt b/w Tche Belew (single), 2015
ATFA014 - Ata Kak: Obaa Sima (album), 2015
ATFA015 - Ata Kak: Obaa Sima (single), 2015
ATFA016 - Ata Kak: Daa Nyinaa, 2015
ATFA018 - SK Kakraba: Songs of Paapieye, 2015
ATFA019 - DJ Katapila: Trotro, 2016
ATFA020 - Awalom Gebremariam: Desdes, 2016
ATFA021 - Hailu Mergia & Dahlak Band: Wede Harer Guzo, 2016
ATFA022 - DJ Katapila: Trotro (12"), 2016
ATFA023 - DJ Katapila: Aroo (EP), 2018
ATFA024 - Awa Poulo: Poulo Warali, 2017
ATFA025 - Umoja: 707, 2017
ATFA026 - "Om" Alec Khaoli: Say You Love Me, 2017
ATFA027 - Professor Rhythm: Bafana Bafana, 2017
ATFA028 - Hailu Mergia: Lala Belu, 2018
ATFA028.5 - Hailu Mergia: Yegojam Mamesh (7"), 2018
ATFA031 - Asnakech Worku: Asnakech, 2018
ATFA032 - Professor Rhythm: Professor 3, 2018
ATFA033 - Jess Sah Bi and Peter One: Our Garden Needs Its Flowers, 2018
ATFA034 - Sourakata Koite: En Hollande, 2019
ATFA035 - Nahawa Doumbia: La Grande Cantatrice Malienne Vol 1, 2019
ATFA036 - Antoinette Konan - "Antoinette Konan", 2019
ATFA037 - Hailu Mergia - "Yene Mircha", 2020
ATFA038 - Ephat Mujuru & The Spirit Of The People - "Mbavaira", 2021
ATFA039 - Nahawa Doumbia - "Kanawa", 2021
ATFA040 - Teno Afrika - "Amapiano Selections", 2021
ATFA041 - Hailu Mergia with The Walias Band - "Tezeta", 2021
ATFA042 - DJ Black Low - "Uwami", 2021
ATFA043 - Native Soul - "Teenage Dreams", 2021

References

Further reading
 
 "Awesome Tapes From Africa Head to Jakarta". Jakarta Globe.
 "The Sudans on cassette: Awesome Tapes from Africa's collection". The Guardian.

External links

American independent record labels
Record labels established in 2006
2006 establishments in New York City